Protilema is a genus of longhorn beetles of the subfamily Lamiinae, containing the following species:

 Protilema gigas Aurivillius, 1908
 Protilema granulosum Breuning, 1942
 Protilema humeridens Aurivillius, 1926
 Protilema montanum Kriesche, 1923
 Protilema papus Vitali & Menufandu, 2010
 Protilema rotundipenne Breuning, 1947
 Protilema strandi Breuning, 1940

References

Morimopsini